The PBA Women's 3x3 was a women's 3x3 basketball competition organized by the Philippine Basketball Association.

History
Following the promotion of the Philippine women's national team to Division I of the FIBA Asia Women's Championship due to their finish in the Division II tournament of the 2015 edition, the Philippine Basketball Association announced on September 24, 2015 that they would host a women's 3x3 tournament in the 2015–16 PBA season. The tournament was meant as a "test market" for women's basketball. Among the regulations imposed on the players, is that they are not allowed to sport a "boy's cut" hairstyle.

2015–16 PBA season
The tournament was officially launched on October 23, 2015 as the PBA Dickies Women's 3x3 Challenge as part of the 2015-16 PBA Philippine Cup. The first games of the tournament were also played as part of the launch. Blackwater Elite claimed the inaugural title by beating Barangay Ginebra San Miguel in the best of three finals while NLEX Road Warriors claimed third place by winning over the Alaska Aces.

For the second conference, the 2016 PBA Commissioner's Cup, the tournament featuring 12 teams was known as the PBA Tag Heuer Women’s 3×3 Tournament. Ginebra placed third at the expense of TNT KaTropa while NLEX claimed the title in Game 2 of their best of three finals against the Rain or Shine Elasto Painters.

In the 2016 PBA Governors' Cup conference, the GlobalPort Batang Pier clinched the title by beating Ginebra in the best of three series.

Results

See also
PBA 3x3
Chooks-to-Go Pilipinas 3x3

References

Women's 3x3
3x3 basketball competitions
3x3 basketball in the Philippines